These were the various orders sent out by the German High Command (OKW) regarding the special treatment to be given to Soviet prisoners of war by the German military in World War II. The order was revised over time.

Among the notable instructions:

 It said that Soviet prisoners are linked with ‘Bolshevism’. By this reason, they should be treated differently from all other POWs.
 “Insubordination, active or passive resistance must immediately be broken completely by force of arms (bayonets, butts and firearms).” German soldiers carrying out this order who do not use their “weapons or does so with insufficient energy” will themselves be punished.
 Escaping Soviet POWs would be shot immediately.
 Civilians and “politically undesirable” Soviet POWs would be ‘segregated’ into separate groups. Departments of the SS, like the Security Police and the Security Service (SD), would be doing most of this work. This was also called ‘screening’ or ‘weeding out’ depending on the translation. In German it is Aussonderung. Then, those ‘segregated’ POWs would be ‘surrendered’ by the military to the SS.

See also 

Commissar Order
Commando Order
Nazi crimes against Soviet POWs

Notes & Bibliography

The orders

 8 September 1941 Order. English translation published in: International Military Tribunal at Nurnberg, Nazi Conspiracy and Aggression, Vol IV. Document 1519-PS. Online at http://avalon.law.yale.edu/imt/1519-ps.asp, and pdf at https://www.loc.gov/rr/frd/Military_Law/NT_Nazi-conspiracy.html
 24 March 1942 Order. English translation published in: International Military Tribunal at Nurnberg, Nazi Conspiracy and Aggression, Vol III. Document 695-PS. Online at https://web.archive.org/web/20090421052603/http://www.ess.uwe.ac.uk/genocide/USSR6.htm and PDF at https://www.loc.gov/rr/frd/Military_Law/NT_Nazi-conspiracy.html

 Other sources 

 International Military Tribunal at Nurnberg, Nazi Conspiracy and Aggression, Supplement A. Online at as a  pdf at https://www.loc.gov/rr/frd/Military_Law/NT_Nazi-conspiracy.html
 Streim, Alfred: Sowjetische Gefangene in Hitlers Vernichtungskrieg. Berichte und Dokumente 1939-1945. Heidelberg: C. F. Müller Juristischer Verlag 1982, S. 36-38, 45, 103-107. Excerpt at http://www.moosburg.org/info/stalag/meinel.html (translate.google.com used)

Nazi war crimes in Russia